Morgan Township may refer to:

Arkansas
 Morgan Township, Cleburne County, Arkansas, in Cleburne County, Arkansas
 Morgan Township, Franklin County, Arkansas, in Franklin County, Arkansas
 Morgan Township, Lawrence County, Arkansas, in Lawrence County, Arkansas
 Morgan Township, Sharp County, Arkansas, in Sharp County, Arkansas

Illinois
 Morgan Township, Coles County, Illinois

Indiana
 Morgan Township, Harrison County, Indiana
 Morgan Township, Owen County, Indiana
 Morgan Township, Porter County, Indiana

Iowa
 Morgan Township, Crawford County, Iowa
 Morgan Township, Decatur County, Iowa
 Morgan Township, Franklin County, Iowa
 Morgan Township, Harrison County, Iowa
 Morgan Township, Woodbury County, Iowa

Kansas
 Morgan Township, Thomas County, Kansas, in Thomas County, Kansas

Minnesota
 Morgan Township, Redwood County, Minnesota

Missouri
 Morgan Township, Mercer County, Missouri

North Carolina
 Morgan Township, Rowan County, North Carolina
 Morgan Township, Rutherford County, North Carolina, in Rutherford County, North Carolina

North Dakota
 Morgan Township, Traill County, North Dakota, in Traill County, North Dakota

Ohio
 Morgan Township, Ashtabula County, Ohio
 Morgan Township, Butler County, Ohio
 Morgan Township, Gallia County, Ohio
 Morgan Township, Knox County, Ohio
 Morgan Township, Morgan County, Ohio
 Morgan Township, Scioto County, Ohio

Pennsylvania
 Morgan Township, Pennsylvania

South Dakota
 Morgan Township, Jones County, South Dakota, in Jones County, South Dakota

Township name disambiguation pages